Serra-di-Ferro is a commune in the Corse-du-Sud department of France on the island of Corsica.

Population

Sights
Torra di Capriona
Tour de Capannella

See also
Communes of the Corse-du-Sud department

References

External links
 

Communes of Corse-du-Sud